John Shanes (July 23, 1844 – January 26, 1904) was a Union Army soldier during the American Civil War. He received the Medal of Honor for gallantry during the Battle of Rutherford's Farm near Winchester, Virginia on July 20, 1864.

Medal of Honor citation
"The President of the United States of America, in the name of Congress, takes pleasure in presenting the Medal of Honor to Private John Shanes, United States Army, for extraordinary heroism on 20 July 1864, while serving with Company K, 14th West Virginia Infantry, in action at Carter's Farm, Virginia. Private Shanes charged upon a Confederate field piece in advance of his comrades and by his individual exertions silenced the piece."

See also

List of Medal of Honor recipients
List of American Civil War Medal of Honor recipients: Q–S

References

External links
 Findagrave entry
Pennsylvania Civil War soldiers

1844 births
1904 deaths
People from Monongalia County, West Virginia
People of West Virginia in the American Civil War
Union Army soldiers
United States Army Medal of Honor recipients
Military personnel from West Virginia
American Civil War recipients of the Medal of Honor